The Collins Dipper was an American homebuilt flying boat that was designed and produced by Collins Aero of Chadds Ford, Pennsylvania and first flown in 1982. The aircraft was supplied in the form of plans for amateur construction. Only one was built and none remain registered.

Design and development
The Dipper was a conversion of a Cessna 150, adding a fiberglass hull and nose to the Cessna land plane. Development was protracted and started in 1964, leading to a first flight in 1982.

The Dipper featured a strut-braced high-wing, a two-seats-in-side-by-side configuration enclosed cockpit with doors, retractable tricycle landing gear and a single engine in pusher configuration mounted above the cabin on struts.

The aircraft is made from aluminum and fiberglass, retaining the Cessna 150's wing and lift struts. The standard engine used was the  Lycoming O-360 powerplant.

The aircraft nose wheel retracted forward and the main landing gear retracted upwards into the rear window space.

The manufacturer estimated the conversion time from the plans as 1000 hours.

Operational history
In 1998 the company reported that 13 sets of plans had been sold and one aircraft was flying.

By December 2013 no examples remained registered in the United States with the Federal Aviation Administration.

Specifications (Dipper)

References

External links
Photo of the Collins Dipper

Dipper
1980s United States sport aircraft
Single-engined pusher aircraft
High-wing aircraft
Homebuilt aircraft
Flying boats
Amphibious aircraft
Aircraft first flown in 1982